The women's 1500 metres event at the 1973 Summer Universiade was held at the Central Lenin Stadium in Moscow with the final on 17 August. It was the first time that this event was contested by women at the Uniersiade.

Results

References

Athletics at the 1973 Summer Universiade
1973